Kielmeyera neglecta is a species of Kielmeyera from Brazil.

Gallery

References

External links
 
 

neglecta
Flora of Brazil